Manistee High School is a public secondary school in Manistee, Michigan, United States. It serves grades 6-12 for the Manistee Area Public School District.

Athletics
Manistee's Chippewas compete in the West Michigan Conference. School colors are Navy blue and gold. The following Michigan High School Athletic Association (MHSAA) sanctioned sports are offered:

Baseball (boys) 
Basketball (girls and boys) 
Girls state champion - 1982
Competitive cheerleading (girls) 
Cross country (girls and boys) 
Football (boys) 
Golf (girls and boys) 
Ice hockey (boys) 
Skiing (girls and boys) 
Girls state champion - 2009
Soccer (girls and boys) 
Softball (girls) 
Swim and dive (girls and boys) 
Tennis (girls) 
Track and field (girls and boys) 
Volleyball (girls) 
Wrestling (girls and boys)

References

Educational institutions in the United States with year of establishment missing
Public high schools in Michigan
Schools in Manistee County, Michigan
1933 establishments in Michigan